Terry C W Wong (born 30 Oct 1984) was a champion apprentice in 2006/07. He rode seven winners in 2009/10 for a career total of 89, but could add only one more in 2010/2011, a season in which he had limited opportunities.

Performance

References

External links
Official Site of Hong Kong Jockey Club
Hong Kong Jockey Club

Hong Kong jockeys
1984 births
Living people